The Arts Education Policy Review is a quarterly peer-reviewed academic journal of arts education. It covers research on PK–12 arts education policy. It is published by Routledge and the editor-in-chief is Colleen Conway (University of Michigan). It was established in 1899 as Design and renamed Design For Arts in Education in 1977, before obtaining its current name in 1992.

Abstracting and indexing 
The journal is abstracted and indexed in:

References

External links 
 
 

English-language journals
Education journals
Arts journals
Routledge academic journals
Publications established in 1899
Quarterly journals